Lancaster is a city in Atchison County, Kansas, United States.  As of the 2020 census, the population of the city was 246.

History
Lancaster was platted in 1857. It may have been named after Lancaster, Pennsylvania. Lancaster was an early contender for county seat.  Lancaster was a station on the Missouri Pacific Railroad.

In 1915, Lancaster contained seven stores, a school, three churches, a grain elevator, a lumber yard, and a hotel.

Geography
Lancaster is located at  (39.571780, -95.303344).

Demographics

2010 census
As of the census of 2010, there were 298 people, 108 households, and 87 families residing in the city. The racial makeup of the city was 98.0% White, 0.3% African American, 1.0% Native American, and 0.7% Asian.

There were 108 households, of which 38.9% had children under the age of 18 living with them, 65.7% were married couples living together, 10.2% had a female householder with no husband present, 4.6% had a male householder with no wife present, and 19.4% were non-families. 16.7% of all households were made up of individuals, and 10.2% had someone living alone who was 65 years of age or older. The average household size was 2.76 and the average family size was 3.08.

The median age in the city was 40 years. 27.9% of residents were under the age of 18; 6.4% were between the ages of 18 and 24; 23.8% were from 25 to 44; 29.6% were from 45 to 64; and 12.4% were 65 years of age or older. The gender makeup of the city was 50.7% male and 49.3% female.

2000 census
As of the census of 2000, there were 291 people, 107 households, and 81 families residing in the city. The racial makeup of the city was 98.28% White, 0.34% African American, 0.34% Native American, and 1.03% from two or more races.

There were 107 households, out of which 42.1% had children under the age of 18 living with them, 63.6% were married couples living together, 8.4% had a female householder with no husband present, and 23.4% were non-families. 21.5% of all households were made up of individuals, and 12.1% had someone living alone who was 65 years of age or older. The average household size was 2.72 and the average family size was 3.12.

In the city, the population was spread out, with 29.9% under the age of 18, 7.9% from 18 to 24, 30.9% from 25 to 44, 17.9% from 45 to 64, and 13.4% who were 65 years of age or older. The median age was 35 years. For every 100 females, there were 96.6 males. For every 100 females age 18 and over, there were 92.5 males.

The median income for a household in the city was $32,500, and the median income for a family was $37,188. Males had a median income of $29,000 versus $21,250 for females. The per capita income for the city was $12,921. About 10.4% of families and 11.6% of the population were below the poverty line, including 14.4% of those under the age of eighteen and 4.7% of those 65 or over.

References

Further reading

External links
 Lancaster - Directory of Public Officials
 USD 377, local school district
 Lancaster city map, KDOT

Cities in Kansas
Cities in Atchison County, Kansas
1857 establishments in Kansas Territory